Class War is an anarchist group and newspaper established by Ian Bone and others in 1983 in the United Kingdom. An incarnation of Class War was briefly registered as a political party for the purposes of fighting the 2015 United Kingdom general election.

Events 
In the 1980s, Class War organised a number of "Bash The Rich" demonstrations, in which supporters were invited to march through and disrupt wealthier areas of London such as Kensington, and Henley-on-Thames, bearing banners and placards with slogans such as "Behold your future executioners!"

A third Bash the Rich event, scheduled to march through Hampstead, in 1985 was largely prevented by a heavy police presence and was acknowledged by Class War to have been a failure. This event was seen by many as a major setback for the group and many members left to form other groups or drifted away.

2010s onwards 

In the 2010s, Ian Bone revived Class War as a political party. Their activities included a weekly protest about "poor doors" outside One Commercial Street in Aldgate, with Action East End and Freedom News. These protests ended in partial victory in November 2014. Group member Lisa McKenzie was found not guilty under joint enterprise for causing criminal damage.

Class War also encouraged a demonstration against the Jack the Ripper Museum.

In  the 2015 United Kingdom general election, Class War stood seven candidates which received a total of 526 votes. The party was voluntarily deregistered with the electoral commission in July 2015.

In July 2021, a group emerged at the London School of Economics called 'LSE Class War' demanding the abolition of the LSESU Hayek Society, a private-school-free LSE and a David Graeber lecture series to commemorate the life of the late academic. The President of the LSESU Hayek Society responding saying they were "totally illegitimate" and have, "no affiliation to the Students’ Union, no affiliation to the university and they’re not an official campaign of the Students’ Union".

References

External links 
 
 Class War covers gallery at Libcom
 Class War archive at Libcom

Anarchist organisations in the United Kingdom
Anarchist newspapers
Anarchist political parties
Mass media and culture in Swansea
Publications established in 1983
Political parties established in 2014
2014 establishments in the United Kingdom